Parliamentary elections were held in the People's Republic of the Congo on 23 September 1984. The country was a one-party state at the time, with the Congolese Party of Labour as the sole legal party. As such, it won all 153 seats in the People's National Assembly, with a voter turnout of 93.64%. 

Only 153 candidates were put forward for the election, of which 68 were party representatives, 55 were from mass organisations, 20 represented regions and Brazzaville and 10 were members of the armed forces.

Results

References

Elections in the Republic of the Congo
Congo
1984 in the Republic of the Congo
One-party elections
Single-candidate elections